Liu Kun (born December 1956) is a Chinese politician and the current Minister of Finance. Previously he served as director of Budgetary Affairs Commission of the National People's Congress, Vice-Minister of Finance, and vice-governor of Guangdong.

Biography

Early life and education
Liu was born in Raoping County, Guangdong in December 1956. In June 1973, during the Cultural Revolution, he was forced to work in a factory in Yunxiao County, Fujian instead of going to university. He entered Xiamen University in February 1978, majoring in finance and monetary economics at the School of Economics, where he graduated in February 1982.

Career
Beginning in 1982, he served in various posts in the Office of the Guangdong Provincial Government, where he served as deputy director until December 2001. He joined the Chinese Communist Party in July 1984. In December 2001 he was promoted to become deputy secretary-general of Guangdong Provincial Government, a department-level position he held until October 2002. He was director of Guangdong Provincial Department of Finance in October 2002, and held that office until July 2010. In July 2010 he was promoted again to become vice-governor of Guangdong, he remained in that position until May 2013, when he was transferred to Beijing and appointed vice-minister of Finance. He became director of Budgetary Affairs Commission of the National People's Congress in December 2016, and served until March 2018. On March 19, 2018, he was elected minister of Finance at the first session of the 13th National People's Congress.

Liu was a member of the 19th Central Commission for Discipline Inspection. He was a delegate to the 10th and 11th, 12th and 13th National People's Congresses.

References

1956 births
Living people
Xiamen University alumni
Central Party School of the Chinese Communist Party alumni
People's Republic of China politicians from Guangdong
Chinese Communist Party politicians from Guangdong
Ministers of Finance of the People's Republic of China
Politicians from Chaozhou
Delegates to the 10th National People's Congress
Delegates to the 11th National People's Congress
Delegates to the 12th National People's Congress
Delegates to the 13th National People's Congress
Members of the 19th Central Committee of the Chinese Communist Party